The men's large hill team ski jumping competition for the 1988 Winter Olympics was held at Canada Olympic Park. It took place on 24 February.

Results

References

Ski jumping at the 1988 Winter Olympics